Mike Gravel unsuccessfully ran for president twice:

 Mike Gravel 2008 presidential campaign
 Mike Gravel 2020 presidential campaign